Aggie Poon Pak Yan is a Hong Kong rugby union player. She competed for Hong Kong at the 2017 Women's Rugby World Cup in Ireland. Hong Kong were making their first Rugby World Cup appearance.

Poon has represented Hong Kong in fifteens and sevens at international level. She played 13 games for Hong Kong before she was made to retire, due to an injured knee. She took up refereeing after her retirement.

References 

Living people
Hong Kong people
Hong Kong rugby union players
Hong Kong female rugby union players
Hong Kong female rugby sevens players
Year of birth missing (living people)
Rugby union players at the 2010 Asian Games
Rugby union players at the 2014 Asian Games
Rugby union players at the 2018 Asian Games